Krestyanskaya Zastava Square is a city square in Moscow, Russia.  He is located to Tagansky and Yuzhnoportovy District at Krestyanskaya Zastava metro station.

Origin and name 
Renamed in 1919, "in honor of the Soviet peasantry." Prior to that - the area Spassky Gate. Zastava was a customs point Collegiate Chamber shaft. The name of the Savior was given outpost near Novospassky monastery.

Squares in Moscow